Virle Gene Rounsaville  (born September 27, 1944 in Konawa, Oklahoma) is a former Major League Baseball pitcher who appeared in eight games for the Chicago White Sox in 1970.

In Rounsaville's last major league appearance, he was one of three pitchers who each gave up a home run to Paul Blair of the Baltimore Orioles.

References

External links

1944 births
Living people
Chicago White Sox players
San Diego Padres (minor league) players
Eugene Emeralds players
Reading Phillies players
Tucson Toros players
Spartanburg Phillies players
Miami Marlins (FSL) players
Bakersfield Bears players
Major League Baseball pitchers
Baseball players from Oklahoma
People from Konawa, Oklahoma
Diablo Valley Vikings baseball players
Junior college men's basketball players in the United States